The 1921 Furman Purple Hurricane football team represented the Furman University as a member of the Southern Intercollegiate Athletic Association (SIAA) during the 1921 college football season. Led by seventh-year head coach Billy Laval, the Purple Hurricane compiled an overall record of 7–2–1 with a mark of 3–2–1 in SIAA play.

Schedule

References

Furman
Furman Paladins football seasons
Furman Purple Hurricane football